This is a list of episodes of the television series Earth: Final Conflict:

Series overview

Episodes

Season 1 (1997–98)

Season 2 (1998–99)
The season was nominated for "Best Photography" (for Michael McMurray ) and "Best Sound Editing" (for Tom Bjelic, John Smith and Rich Harkness) in a Dramatic Program or Series at the 14th Gemini Awards

Season 3 (1999–2000)
This is the first season to be presented in the 1.78:1 "widescreen" aspect ratio on DVD. Starting with the third episode, the DVD makers forgot to remove the television broadcast's "Dolby Surround where available" tag at the beginning of episodes.

Season 4 (2000–01)

Season 5 (2001–02)

Lists of science fiction television series episodes
Lists of Canadian television series episodes